Secret Agent of Japan is a 1942 film directed by Irving Pichel. It was the first American anti-Japanese war film produced by a major studio after the attack on Pearl Harbor.  The film stars Preston Foster as a nightclub owner in Shanghai who becomes involved in espionage revolving around preparations for the attack.

Cast
Preston Foster as James Carmichael, alias Roy Bonnell
Lynn Bari as Kay Murdock
Noel Madison as Isoda Saito
Victor Sen Yung as Fu Yen
Janis Carter as Doris Poole
Steven Geray as Mulhauser, alias Constantin Alexandri
Kurt Katch as Traeger
Addison Richards as Detective Remsen
Ian Wolfe as Capt. Karl Larsen
Hermine Sterler as Frau Mulhauser
Selmer Jackson as American Naval Captain
Frank Puglia as Victor Eminescu
Leyland Hodgson as English Secret Service
Leslie Denison as English Secret Service
Jean Del Val as Pierre Solaire

Critical reception
The film drew mixed reviews from critics. Theodore Strauss of New York Times panned the film, calling it "a very mild hate-brew" and "third-rate drama", and stating, "Nowadays, we doubt whether anybody, even Hirohito, will be much excited". Variety wrote that "the picture doesn't achieve more than moderately entertaining proportions for the adult ... Foster and Miss Bari show off excellently, though some of the supporting parts are pretty awful." Film Daily called it "a rousing melodrama" but found the twists and turns of the plot confusing. Harrison's Reports wrote: "An engrossing espionage melodrama that is timely. The story value is good, and competent direction and excellent performances help maintain the interest throughout."

The film seems to "have legs", though, as it scores a 6.9/10 stars on IMDB (see link below).

References

External links

1942 films
American spy films
American black-and-white films
Films directed by Irving Pichel
Pearl Harbor films
American World War II propaganda films
1940s spy films
20th Century Fox films
Films set in Shanghai
Japan in non-Japanese culture